The Hunter 240 is an American trailerable sailboat that was designed by the Hunter Design Team and first built in 1998.

Production
The design was built by Hunter Marine in the United States from 1998 to 2005, but it is now out of production.

Design
The Hunter 240 is a recreational keelboat, built predominantly of fiberglass. It has a fractional sloop B&R rig, a raked stem, a walk-through reverse transom, a transom-hung rudder controlled by a tiller and a retractable centerboard. It displaces  and carries  of flooding water ballast. The ballast is drained for road transport.

The boat is normally fitted with a small  outboard motor for docking and maneuvering.

Factory standard equipment included a 110% genoa, outboard motor bracket, dinette table, potable head, highway trailer, anchor and life jackets. Factory optional equipment included a Bimini top, camper tent enclosure, spinnaker, and a roller furling jib.

The design has sleeping accommodation for four people, with a double "V"-berth in the bow cabin nd an aft cabin with a transversely-mounted double berth. The galley is located on the port side just forward of the companionway ladder. The galley is equipped with a single-burner stove and a sink. The head is located in the bow cabin on the starboard , under the "V"-berth.

The design has a PHRF racing average handicap of 255 with a high of 255 and low of 258.

Operational history
In a 2010 review Steve Henkel wrote, "Best features: As with other Hunter trailer-sailers, the 240 has an innovative mast-raising system which makes rigging relatively fast and easy, and a custom trailer that fits the boat and eliminates some of the hassle of launching at a ramp. A movable table ... can be set up in the cockpit or the cabin. Worst features: Water ballast has never worked very well for any of the under 26-foot boats on which it has been tried, and the Hunter is no exception."

See also
List of sailing boat types

Similar sailboats
Hunter 19-2
Hunter 23.5
Hunter 260
Hunter 27 Edge
MacGregor 26

References

External links
Official brochure

Keelboats
1990s sailboat type designs
Sailing yachts
Trailer sailers
Sailboat type designs by Hunter Design Team
Sailboat types built by Hunter Marine